Atlantic Express may refer to:

 Atlantic Express (airline), a trading name for Atlantic Air Transport, a British airline.
 Atlantic Express (Gambia airline) a Gambian airline 2004–2005
 Atlantic Express, the previous name for U.S.-based Eos Airlines
 Atlantic Express (bus company), a public and school bus operating company in the United States
 Atlantic Express, a named train operated by the Canadian Pacific Railway
 Atlantic Express and Pacific Express, a named train operated by the Erie Railroad
 Atlantic Coast Express, a former express passenger train between London and seaside resorts

See also 
 Atlantic City Express (disambiguation)